Woodland Snap is a version of the classic children's game Snap, with woodland animals as the characters. It uses a proprietary pack with 11 animal characters and 4 of each card. The game was first published in 1960 by Pepys Games and the illustrations were drawn by children's author and artist Racey Helps (1913-70). The cards started off as basic black and white drawings, but over fifty years they have developed into colour.

Playing 
The game follows the normal rules of Snap, but in addition the pack contains guidance on etiquette and rules for more advanced games.

Characters 
There are eleven characters in the game:
Humphry Goggle - the male toad
Mrs. Croak - the female toad
Barnaby Littlemouse - the male mouse
Millicent Littlemouse - the female mouse
Widow Pintips - the old hedgehog
Prettywigs Pattikin - the female squirrel
Tippetty Nippet - the young squirrel
Hoppy Spadge - the sparrow
Nubby Tope - the mole
Dr. Bunfuz - the rabbit
Mr. Cunningleigh-Sligh - the fox

References

External links
 http://www.wopc.co.uk/uk/pepys/woodland-snap

Card games introduced in 1960
Dedicated deck card games
Card games for children